Henry Bartell Zachry (1901–1984), also known as H.B. Zachry and Pat Zachry was the founder and former president and chairman of H.B. Zachry Company, the parent company of Zachry Holdings Inc. and Zachry Construction Corporation. He earned a degree in civil engineering from Texas A&M University in 1922 and, after a brief career with the Texas Department of Transportation, founded the H.B. Zachry Company in 1924. Zachry's firm constructed the Hilton Palacio del Rio Hotel in San Antonio, TX using modular construction in a record 202 working days, the upper decks at Kyle Field in 1979, built part of the Alaskan pipeline, laid roads in Peru and Chile, erected dams in the United States and Canada and ventured into the Sinai to construct modular housing for peacekeeping troops.

In 2001, he received the Carroll H. Dunn Award of Excellence from the Construction Industry Institute. He is the namesake of the Zachry Engineering Education Complex at Texas A&M University.

References

External Resources

Interview with Bartell Zachry, July 29, 1994, University of Texas at San Antonio: Institute of Texan Cultures: Oral History Collections, UA 15.01, University of Texas at San Antonio Libraries Special Collections.

American businesspeople
Texas A&M University alumni
1901 births
1984 deaths